Bijoynagar is a town in the Kamrup district. It is on the south bank of the river Brahmaputra.

Transport
Bijoynagar is located on National Highway 17 and is well together with Guwahati and other nearby towns with both government and private commercial vehicles.

Religion

Religion 

As of the 2021 census, 39.45% of the population are Hindus, Muslims are 39.45% and Jain are 1.55%.

Education

 Amrit Chandra Thakuria Commerce College
 Haligaon High Madrasa School
 Uparhali Higher Secondary School
 Sarpara Gangapukhuri LP School
 Sarpara Girl's High School
 Sarpara Madrasa High School
 Faculty Public English Medium School
 Benison CBSE School
 Dibyojyoti School
 Assam Jatiya bidyalay School
 Uparhali Girl's High School
 Kidzee school

See also
 Sarpara
 Haligaon
 Simina
 Futuri
 Uparhali
 Dakhala
 Satrapara
 Khulungpara
 Jharobari
 Nohira

References

Cities and towns in Kamrup district